Ninatta and Kulitta were two goddesses always invoked together who were the handmaidens of the Hurrian goddess Shaushka, the Hurrian counterpart of Mesopotamian Ishtar.

Functions
Ninatta and Kulitta were regarded as divine musicians. In a myth known as Song of Ḫedammu, part of the so-called Kumarbi Cycle,  they assist their mistress during her attempt at subduing the eponymous monster with a love potion.

The origin of their names is unknown, though it has been proposed that Kulitta's name might have Anatolian etymology and that Ninatta's might be derived from the place name Ninêt (Ni-ne-etki) or Nenit (Ne-en-itki) known from documents from Mari and Tell al-Rimah, possibly an Amorite spelling of Nineveh. Occasional references to a goddess called "Ishtar of Ninêt" are known from these locations, and Joan Goodnick Westenholz tentatively connects her with Shaushka, Ishtar of Nineveh and Ninatta, though she states it is presently not possible to ascertain the relationship between these deities and their names in the earliest periods.

In ritual texts other deities were grouped with Ninatta and Kulitta as members of Shaushka's entourage. Examples include Šintal-wuri (Hurrian: "seven-eyed"), Šintal-irti ("seven-breasted"), Šinan-tatukarni ("twofold at [?] love") and Namrazunna (from Akkadian namru, shining, and Zunna, a Hurrianized spelling of Suen; unlike him Namrazunna was female). However Ninatta and Kullita were not identified as Shaushka's sukkals, as this position instead belonged to the deity Undurumma, attested with certainty in only one document, which also mentions other Hurrian sukkals: Immanzizi, Ḫupuštukar, Tenu, Lipparuma and Mukišanu.

Worship

Ninatta and Kulitta are presently known only from western Hurrian sources from Ugarit and Hattusa.  In Ugarit they are attested in a ritual text (KTU 1.116) which, while dedicated to the local goddess Ashtart, involved Shaushka and other Hurrian deities.

Like many Hurrian deities they were incorporated into the Hittite pantheon, and are among the gods depicted in the Yazilikaya sanctuary.

The veneration of Ninatta and Kulitta as a pair is an example of a process common in Hurrian religion, in which pairs of related deities was believed to act as a unity and were therefore venerated together. Some of the other examples include Allani and Ishara or Hutena and Hutellura.

Later relevance
In the first millennium BCE Ninatta and Kulitta are attested in the entourages of Ishtar of Arbela, Ishtar of Assur, and Ishtar of Nineveh. The Akkadian spellings of their names known from neo-Assyrian sources are dNi-ni-tum and dKu-li-it-tum.

References

Bibliography

Hurrian deities
Hittite deities
Mesopotamian goddesses
Ugaritic deities
Music and singing goddesses
Inanna
Mythological duos